The sport of futsal was widely played in Russia and the Russian national team was one of the major powers in European futsal as of 2016, participating in the FIFA Futsal World Cup and the European UEFA Futsal Championship. The main competitions within the country are the Russian Futsal Super League and the Russian Women's Futsal Super League.

Because of the 2022 Russian invasion of Ukraine, FIFA and Union of European Football Associations (UEFA) suspended from FIFA and UEFA competitions all Russian teams, whether national representative teams or club teams.

Russia national futsal team

World Cup record

European Championship record

Russia students futsal team

Universiade record

Russian futsal champions

Russian futsal National Cup winners

Russian futsal Top League Cup winners

References

 
Sport in Russia by sport